Chen Shu-chuan (born 20 April 1978) is a retired Taiwanese athlete who specialised in the sprinting events. She represented her country at the 2000 Summer Olympics without advancing to the second round.

Her personal bests are 11.47 seconds in the 100 metres (-0.5 m/s, Banchiao 2003) and 23.47 seconds in the 200 metres (+1.0 m/s, Bangkok 1997).

Competition record

References

All-Athletics profile

1978 births
Living people
Taiwanese female sprinters
Athletes (track and field) at the 1998 Asian Games
Athletes (track and field) at the 2002 Asian Games
Athletes (track and field) at the 2000 Summer Olympics
World Athletics Championships athletes for Chinese Taipei
Olympic athletes of Taiwan
Place of birth missing (living people)
Asian Games competitors for Chinese Taipei
Olympic female sprinters